Rudolph Pilous (August 11, 1914 – December 5, 1994) was a Canadian ice hockey player and coach, born in Winnipeg, Manitoba. Pilous won the Stanley Cup coaching the Chicago Black Hawks in 1960–61, and was inducted into the Hockey Hall of Fame in 1985 in the builder category.

Playing career
Pilous played junior ice hockey in the Manitoba Junior Hockey League before becoming a New York Rangers prospect. During 1937–38, Pilous played minor professional hockey with the New York Rovers of the Eastern Hockey League. Unable to reach the National Hockey League, Pilous transferred the St. Catharines Saints, a senior ice hockey in the Ontario Hockey Association Senior division from 1938 to 1941.

Coach and team builder
In 1943, Pilous cofounded the St. Catharines Falcons, a junior ice hockey team in the Ontario Hockey Association. Pilous left the Falcons in 1946, spending the 1946–47 season as a scout for the nearby Buffalo Bisons. Pilous spent the 1947–48 season in Houston, Texas, winning the USHL Championship. In 1948–49, Pilous led the San Diego Skyhawks to the Pacific Coast Hockey League title.

After the PCHL, Pilous returned to the team he founded in St. Catharines, now known as the St. Catharines Teepees. He coached the team to a Memorial Cup championship in the 1954 Memorial Cup, and was its general manager for the 1960 Memorial Cup victory.

Pilous coached the Chicago Black Hawks from 1958 to 1963. In the 1961 Stanley Cup Finals, he led the Hawks to Stanley Cup victory.

Pilous coached the Denver Invaders in 1963–64 to the Western Hockey League's Governor's Trophy. After a brief stint with the Hamilton Red Wings, Pilous was hired to be the initial general manager of the expansion Oakland Seals in 1967. Pilous was quickly dismissed by team owners, and joined the Denver Spurs of the WHL, building them into a first place team by 1972.

Pilous returned to his childhood home in Manitoba, with the Brandon Wheat Kings and subsequently coaching the Winnipeg Jets. Pilous later became general manager, and led the Jets to Avco World Trophy championships in 1976, 1978 and 1979.

Pilous' coaching career ended where it started in St. Catharines 43 years earlier, at the helm of the St. Catharines Saints from 1983 to 1986.

Personal life and death
Pilous died at his home in of a heart attack on December 5, 1994. He was survived by his wife Margaret and his two daughters in Rosemarie and Mary Lou.

Coaching record

Awards and achievements 
USHL Championship (1948)
PCHL Championship (1949)
Memorial Cup Championships (1954 & 1960)
Stanley Cup Championship (1961)
WHL regular season Championship (1964)
Avco Cup (WHA) (1976, 1978, & 1979)
Inducted into the Hockey Hall of Fame in 1985
Honoured Member of the Manitoba Hockey Hall of Fame

References

External links
 
 Rudy Pilous's biography at Manitoba Hockey Hall of Fame

1914 births
1994 deaths
Brandon Wheat Kings coaches
California Golden Seals executives
California Golden Seals coaches
Canadian ice hockey coaches
Chicago Blackhawks coaches
Denver Invaders
Hockey Hall of Fame inductees
New York Rovers players
Portage Terriers players
Ice hockey people from Winnipeg
Stanley Cup champions
Stanley Cup championship-winning head coaches
Winnipeg Jets (1972–1996) coaches
Winnipeg Jets (1972–1996) executives
Winnipeg Monarchs players
World Hockey Association coaches